Sándor Kiss (born 2 November 1956) is a Hungarian former footballer and manager who played as a forward and made two appearances for the Hungary national team.

Career
Kiss made his international debut for Hungary on 22 September 1982 in a friendly match against Turkey, in which he scored the fourth goal of the 5–0 home win. He made his second and final appearance on 26 October 1983 in a UEFA Euro 1984 qualifying match against Denmark, scoring the only goal in the 1–0 home win.

After retiring from his playing career, he became a manager.

Career statistics

International

International goals

References

External links
 
 
 
 

1956 births
Living people
People from Szekszárd
Hungarian footballers
Hungary international footballers
Hungarian expatriate footballers
Hungarian expatriate sportspeople in Spain
Expatriate footballers in Spain
Hungarian expatriate sportspeople in Finland
Expatriate footballers in Finland
Association football forwards
Komlói Bányász SK footballers
Pécsi MFC players
Újpest FC players
FC Cartagena footballers
Zalaegerszegi TE players
Hangö IK players
Nemzeti Bajnokság I players
Nemzeti Bajnokság II players
Segunda División players
Kakkonen players
Hungarian football managers
Sportspeople from Tolna County